The Los Angeles Wave is an African-American newspaper created by C.Z. Wilson, first published in 1912 in Los Angeles, California. It has 92,000 subscribers, which is more subscribers that any other black newspaper. The newspaper group claims to have circulation of 1.2 million serving diverse neighborhoods in the greater Los Angeles area.

History 
The paper continues to cover issues that are of interest to African-American readers. They have a section entitled "This Week In Black History" where they cover historic news; especially relevant to Los Angeles readers.

The Wave publications are known as the best way to reach African-American readers in the Los Angeles area.

References

African-American newspapers
Mass media in Los Angeles County, California
Newspapers established in 1912
Defunct newspapers published in California
1912 establishments in Indiana